Heinz Budde (October 8, 1925 – September 14, 1991) was a German politician of the Christian Democratic Union (CDU) and former member of the German Bundestag.

Life 
Budde joined the CDU in January 1946, was co-founder of the Junge Union (JU) in the British occupation zone and chairman of the JU district association in Bochum. In 1963, he became a member of the main board of the Christian Democratic Workers' Union (CDA). Budde was a member of the German Bundestag from 1965 to 1969. He had entered the parliament via the state list of North Rhine-Westphalia.

Literature

References

1925 births
1991 deaths
Members of the Bundestag for North Rhine-Westphalia
Members of the Bundestag 1965–1969
Members of the Bundestag for the Christian Democratic Union of Germany